Henare Wiremu Taratoa ( 1830 – 21 June 1864) was a notable New Zealand tribal missionary, teacher and war leader. Of Māori descent, he identified with the Ngāi Te Rangi iwi. He was killed in the Battle of Te Ranga.

References

Year of birth uncertain
1864 deaths
New Zealand Māori religious leaders
New Zealand Anglican missionaries
New Zealand educators
Ngāi Te Rangi people
Anglican missionaries in New Zealand